James Charles Hughes (1886 – April 1943) was an Australian medical practitioner and rugby union player who represented Australia.

Hughes, a flanker, was born in Sydney and claimed a total of 2 international rugby caps for Australia. His brother Bryan was also an Australian rugby union representative player.

References

                   

Australian rugby union players
Australia international rugby union players
1943 deaths
1886 births
Rugby union flankers
Rugby union players from Sydney